L'Île-Bouchard is a commune in the Indre-et-Loire department in central France.

From 8 to 14 December 1947, L'Île-Bouchard was the site of Marian apparitions. Four girls aged 7 to 12 reported having seen the Virgin Mary and the archangel Gabriel. The site was declared an official pilgrimage of the diocese of Tours on 8 December 2001 by the archbishop Monseigneur André Vingt-Trois. Since 1999, priests and lay persons from Emmanuel Community have been in charge of the pilgrims.

Population

See also
Communes of the Indre-et-Loire department

References

Communes of Indre-et-Loire
Marian apparitions